During the 1996–97 English football season, Bristol Rovers F.C. competed in the Football League Second Division.

Season summary
In the 1996–97 season, Holloway took over as manager with the club struggling both on and off the pitch. In his first season in charge of Bristol Rovers, he led the club to 17th place in Division Two.

Final league table

Results
Bristol Rovers' score comes first

Legend

Football League Second Division

FA Cup

League Cup

Football League Trophy

Squad

References

Bristol Rovers F.C. seasons
Bristol Rovers